"Zion" is a David Bowie bootleg.  It is most commonly said to have been recorded at Trident Studios in January 1973, during Bowie's Aladdin Sane sessions.

Music and lyrics
"Zion" consisted of Bowie's "la las" with Mike Garson playing piano, Mick Ronson playing guitar, and Mellotron (using the "flute" tapes, similar or identical to those used by the Beatles on "Strawberry Fields Forever") by someone unknown (probably Bowie).  There are also Mellotron "string" parts, probably also played by Bowie, as well as drums and bass.  Bowie played similar Mellotron parts on Diamond Dogs.  This would evolve into the passage from "Sweet Thing (Reprise)" to "Rebel Rebel" on Diamond Dogs.

Other names
Other names for this track are "Aladdin Vein," "Love Aladdin Vein," "A lad in vein," and "Tragic Moments."  The first three are meant to recreate the pun that was Aladdin Sane (a lad insane) by changing the last word to vein. (A lad in vein) The other name, "Tragic Moments," was named after an act in the aborted 1984 musical Bowie was creating during the Diamond Dogs sessions.

When recorded
Bowie chronologist Kevin Cann states that Bowie recorded "Zion" at Trident Studios in January 1973 during the Aladdin Sane sessions.  One piece of evidence that the piece may have been recorded (or at least undergone overdubbing) during the July 1973 Pin Ups sessions at the Château d'Hérouville is an interview by journalist Martin Hayman at the end of the July sessions, which noted that Bowie played the "Zion" recording for Hayman as a work in progress.  Hayman has Bowie saying it was a demo for a piece to be used in the musical that he was planning at the time (which became his next album, Diamond Dogs).

References

Pegg, Nicholas, The Complete David Bowie, Reynolds & Hearn Ltd, 2000, 

David Bowie songs
1973 songs
Songs written by David Bowie